Michael Kelly (born May 22, 1969) is an American actor,  best known for his role as Doug Stamper on the television drama series House of Cards.

Early life and education
Kelly grew up in Lawrenceville, Georgia, the son of Maureen and Michael Kelly. His father is of Irish descent, and his mother is of Italian ancestry. Kelly graduated from Coastal Carolina University in 1992 with a degree in performing arts.

Career
In addition to playing Doug Stamper in all six seasons of House of Cards, Kelly has appeared in films such as Changeling, Dawn of the Dead, The Adjustment Bureau, Chronicle, Now You See Me, and Everest. He also appeared in the television miniseries Generation Kill, six episodes of The Sopranos as Agent Ron Goddard, the Criminal Minds spin-off series Criminal Minds: Suspect Behavior, and as Dr. Edgar Dumbarton in Taboo.

Personal life
Kelly resides in New York City. He and his wife Karyn married in 2005, and they have two children.

Filmography

Film

Television

References

External links

20th-century American male actors
21st-century American male actors
1969 births
American male film actors
American male television actors
American people of Irish descent
American people of Italian descent
Coastal Carolina University alumni
Living people
Male actors from Georgia (U.S. state)
Male actors from Philadelphia
People from Lawrenceville, Georgia
Audiobook narrators